Matheus Fellipe Costa Pereira (born 5 May 1996) is a Brazilian professional footballer who plays as an  attacking midfielder or right winger for UAE Pro League club Al Wahda on loan from Al Hilal.

Club career

Sporting CP
Born in Belo Horizonte, Minas Gerais, Pereira moved to Portugal at a young age, joining Sporting CP's youth system at the age of 14. On 18 January 2014, whilst still a junior, he made his debut as a senior with the B team, coming on as a 46th-minute substitute for Cristian Ponde in a 1–1 away draw against C.D. Trofense in the Segunda Liga. He scored his first goal in the competition on 7 March of the following year, contributing to a 4–3 home win over C.D. Tondela.

Early into the 2015–16 season, Pereira was first called to the main squad by newly appointed manager Jorge Jesus. His first competitive appearance took place on 1 October, as he started in a 1–1 draw at Beşiktaş J.K. in the UEFA Europa League. Late in the same month he scored his first goals as a professional, helping defeat U.D. Vilafranquense in the Taça de Portugal (4–0, away) and KF Skënderbeu Korçë in the Europa League (5–1, home), being subsequently selected for the latter competition's team of the week.

Pereira was loaned to fellow Primeira Liga club G.D. Chaves in the 2017–18 campaign. He scored seven league goals during his spell (eight overall), helping them to a sixth-place finish.

On 31 August 2018, the last day of the summer transfer window, Pereira joined 1. FC Nürnberg on loan until the end of the season after criticising José Peseiro's choice of not selecting him to the first match against Moreirense F.C. on social media. He made his Bundesliga debut 16 days later, playing 61 minutes in a 1–1 away draw against SV Werder Bremen.

Pereira scored his first league goal on 30 March 2019, helping the hosts defeat FC Augsburg 3–0. He was nominated for the Bundesliga Rookie of the Season award, but his team suffered relegation after finishing last.

West Bromwich Albion
On 8 August 2019, Pereira joined West Bromwich Albion on an initial season-long loan with a view to a permanent move. He scored his first goal in the Championship on 28 September, in a 2–0 away win against Queens Park Rangers.

On 20 June 2020, after the player had appeared in the required number of matches, a buyout clause was triggered, obligating the club into Pereira’s purchase. The following month, he won the Supporters’ Player of the Season award after collecting 65% of the votes.

Despite the buyout clause being met months earlier, it took until 17 August 2020 for Pereira to be officially announced as an Albion player, eventually signing a four-year contract. To ensure the player’s focus remained on the field, the board decided to leave the negotiations until after the season had ended.

Pereira made his Premier League debut on 13 September 2020, playing the entire 0–3 home loss against Leicester City. He scored his first goal six days later, through a direct free kick in a 5–2 away defeat to Everton. 

On 3 April 2021, Pereira scored a brace in first-half stoppage time in an eventual 5–2 win at Chelsea; this sealed Albion's first victory at Stamford Bridge since 1978, and handed Thomas Tuchel his first loss as the opposition's head coach. On 9 May, his tenth goal of the season – becoming the first club player to get on double digits since Saido Berahino in 2014–15 – amounted to nothing because his team lost 3–1 at Arsenal and confirmed their relegation.

On 1 August 2021, recently appointed manager Valérien Ismaël announced that Pereira would leave the club before the end of the transfer window, accusing him of "not being committed". The following day, the latter released a statement on his social media accounts, confirming that he wished to leave but also expressing anger at the former's comments, branding them "disrespectful".

Al Hilal
On 6 August 2021, Pereira agreed to a deal with Al Hilal SFC for an undisclosed fee. He scored his first goal for the club the following 6 February, in a 6–1 rout of Al Jazira Club in the second round of the FIFA Club World Cup.

Pereira was loaned to Al Wahda FC of the UAE Pro League in January 2023, until June.

Club statistics

Honours
Al Hilal
Saudi Professional League: 2021–22
Saudi Super Cup: 2021
AFC Champions League: 2021

References

External links

Portuguese League profile 

1996 births
Living people
Brazilian footballers
Footballers from Belo Horizonte
Association football wingers
Primeira Liga players
Liga Portugal 2 players
Sporting CP B players
Sporting CP footballers
G.D. Chaves players
Bundesliga players
1. FC Nürnberg players
Premier League players
English Football League players
West Bromwich Albion F.C. players
Saudi Professional League players
Al Hilal SFC players
UAE Pro League players
Al Wahda FC players
Brazilian expatriate footballers
Expatriate footballers in Portugal
Expatriate footballers in Germany
Expatriate footballers in England
Expatriate footballers in Saudi Arabia
Expatriate footballers in the United Arab Emirates
Brazilian expatriate sportspeople in Portugal
Brazilian expatriate sportspeople in Germany
Brazilian expatriate sportspeople in England
Brazilian expatriate sportspeople in Saudi Arabia
Brazilian expatriate sportspeople in the United Arab Emirates